Sulcomitrella is a genus of sea snails, marine gastropod mollusks in the family Columbellidae, the dove snails.

Species
Species within the genus Sulcomitrella include:
 Sulcomitrella adversa K. Monsecour & D. Monsecour, 2016
 Sulcomitrella aikeni (Lussi, 2009)
 Sulcomitrella alisiensis K. Monsecour & D. Monsecour, 2016
 Sulcomitrella circumstriata (Schepman, 1911)
 Sulcomitrella evanescens K. Monsecour & D. Monsecour, 2016
 Sulcomitrella hohonu K. Monsecour & D. Monsecour, 2018
 Sulcomitrella humerosa K. Monsecour & D. Monsecour, 2018
 Sulcomitrella imbecillis K. Monsecour & D. Monsecour, 2016
 Sulcomitrella imperfecta K. Monsecour & D. Monsecour, 2016
 † Sulcomitrella januskiewiczi (Friedberg, 1938) 
 Sulcomitrella kanamaruana (Kuroda, 1953)
 Sulcomitrella leylae K. Monsecour & D. Monsecour, 2018
 Sulcomitrella macdonaldensis K. Monsecour & D. Monsecour, 2018
 Sulcomitrella monodonta (Habe, 1958)

References

 Habe, T. (1958). Descriptions of ten new gastropod species. Venus. 20(1): 32-42.
 Kuroda, T.; Habe, T.; Oyama, K. (1971). The sea shells of Sagami Bay. Maruzen Co., Tokyo. xix, 1-741 (Japanese text), 1-489 (English text), 1-51 (Index), pls 1-121.

External links

Columbellidae